The Centaurus Cluster (A3526) is a cluster of hundreds of galaxies, located approximately 170 million light-years away in the Centaurus constellation.  The brightest member galaxy is the elliptical galaxy NGC 4696 (~11m). The Centaurus cluster shares its supercluster, the Hydra–Centaurus Supercluster, with IC4329 Cluster and Hydra Cluster.

The cluster consists of two different sub-groups of galaxies with different velocities. Cen 30 is the main subgroup containing NGC 4696. Cen 45 which is centered on NGC 4709, is moving at 1500 km/s relative to Cen 30, and is believed to be merging with the main cluster.

Gallery

See also
 Abell catalogue
 List of Abell clusters
 X-ray astronomy

References

External links
 

 

3526
Hydra-Centaurus Supercluster
Abell richness class 0